The 1989 Tour of the Basque Country was the 29th edition of the Tour of the Basque Country cycle race and was held from 3 April to 7 April 1989. The race started in Lazkao and finished in Zumaia. The race was won by Stephen Roche of the Fagor team.

General classification

References

1989
Bas